Adolf Fritz, generally called Dr. Fritz (Munich, ? – Estonia, 1918), was a hypothetical German surgeon whose spirit has allegedly been channeled by several Brazilian psychic surgeons, starting with Zé Arigó in the 1950s and continuing up to the present.  There is no evidence that he actually existed.

Alleged manifestations
In the 1950s, psychic surgeon Zé Arigó (1918–1971) claimed to be operating as a channel for the spirit of a Dr. Adolf Fritz, a German doctor who had died in World War I. Arigó became famous in Brazil and abroad, and was the subject of documentaries and books.

After Arigó's death in a car accident, two brothers, Oscar and Edivaldo Wilde, claimed to channel the spirit of Dr. Fritz. Their careers were cut short when both died in violent car crashes. 

Following them was Edson Queiroz, a gynecologist. Queiroz treated hundreds of thousands of patients in the guise of Dr. Fritz, while further advancing the techniques of Arigó. He, too, met a violent death at the hand of a knife-wielding assailant. 

After Queiroz's death, Dr. Fritz has been allegedly channeled by a Rubens Farias Jr. (1954– ) of São Paulo; who claims that Dr. Fritz has predicted his own violent death.

Several  other mediums, including alleged medium Kléber Aran Ferreira da Silva have been reportedly able to channel Dr. Fritz' spirit.

Exhaustive research has found no mention of a doctor with any of those names in German records.

See also
Kardecism

References

 Lyn Halper Adventures of a Suburban Mystic: A True Story of Spiritual Transformation and Supernatural Encounters Trafford Publishing, 2001
 William Moreira Dr. Fritz the Phenomenon of the Millennium iUniverse, 2001
 Franz Höllinger Religiöse Kultur in Brasilien: zwischen traditionellem Volksglauben und modernen Erweckungsbewegungen Campus Verlag, 2007

External links
Dr. Fritz—the Skeptics's Dictionary
James Randi Educational Foundation

1918 deaths
Date of birth unknown
Physicians from Munich